The International Motor Press Association (IMPA), is the oldest trade association representing automotive journalists and public relations professionals in the United States. It was established in 1909.

Activities

Monthly meetings 
On the third Thursday of each month, members in New York City hold a luncheon meeting. The purpose of the meeting is twofold:
 Provide speakers from the Automotive industry to discuss topics such as:
 Automotive products
 Current and future automotive technologies
 Market conditions
 Marketing trends
 Motorsports
 Provide a place for member networking

New York International Automobile Show Breakfast 
Prior to the opening of press days for the yearly New York International Auto Show, the IMPA hosts a breakfast meeting for its members at the Jacob K. Javits Convention Center in New York City. Here, a speaker from the leadership of the automotive industry provides insight into key issues in that industry. In addition, the association presents its annual Ken W. Purdy Award for excellence in automotive journalism.

Annual Test Days 
For two days each fall, IMPA members have the opportunity to test drive new and improved automobiles on an auto-test track and, as appropriate, off-road. A typical location for the test track is the Pocono Raceway in the Pocono Mountains of Pennsylvania at Long Pond. Concluding this event is the annual "Test Fest" dinner, providing banquet, socializing, and social networking.

References 

International trade associations
International journalism organizations
Organizations established in 1909
Automobile associations in the United States